Ilaria Fontana (born 26 June 1984) is an Italian politician from the Five Star Movement. She is a member of the Chamber of Deputies and is Undersecretary of State at the Ministry of the Ecological Transition in the Draghi Government.

References

See also 

 List of members of the Italian Chamber of Deputies, 2018–

Living people
1984 births
21st-century Italian women politicians
Deputies of Legislature XVIII of Italy
Five Star Movement politicians
Women government ministers of Italy
20th-century Italian women
Deputies of Legislature XIX of Italy
Women members of the Chamber of Deputies (Italy)